Moscow Institute of Thermal Technology (MITT) is a Russian (formerly Soviet) engineering and scientific research institute founded on May 13, 1946. The institute is located in the Otradnoye District in the north of Moscow.

Previously, it was primarily focused on developing ballistic missiles and rockets to increase the nation's strategic deterrent capability. Today it is also involved in civilian projects and has modified some of its intercontinental ballistic missiles into launch vehicles to be used for satellites. The name can also be translated as Moscow Institute of Thermal Equipment.

History
April 19, 1945 the State Defense Committee of the USSR issued a decree №8206 ordering the People's Commissar for Armament Boris Vannikov to create a weapons design bureau and a pilot plant for missiles. In accordance with this resolution, in 1945 was created the Central Design Bureau GTSKB 1 under People's Commissariat for Armament (the Commissariat for military ammunition and other such things); the GTSKB-1 was actively engaged in collecting materials from the German rocket technology. During the post-war reorganization of the Soviet economy in early 1946 the People's Commissariat for Armament was transformed into the Ministry of Agricultural Engineering of the USSR.

A decree of the Council of Ministers of the USSR №1017-419ss from May 13, 1946 ordered the Ministry of Agricultural Engineering to create a research institute of rocket propellants based on GTSKB-1. 

May 15, 1946 order number 114ss of the Minister of Agricultural Engineering created Research Institute № 1 (NII-1) as part of the 6th Main Directorate; NII-1 fulfilled the requirement of establishing a research institute of rocket propellants based on GTSKB-1. May 18, 1946 by order number 118ss, NII-1 (formerly GTSKB 1) was incorporated into the newly formed General Directorate for Jet Technology ministry. In 1947, the order № 126 of the Minister approved the Regulations on the institute NII-1 (the organization of the same name existed in many sectors, which was considered an additional condition of secrecy work).

In 1966 the institute was transferred to the jurisdiction of the Ministry of the Defense Industry. In March 1966 NII-1 was given its current name. Aleksandr Nadiradze was chief designer of the institute from 1967 to 1987.

In July 2009 the institute's General Director and Chief designer Yuri Solomonov resigned after the July 15, 2009 test launch failure of Bulava naval-based ICBM designed by MITT.

Structure
Companies included in JSC MITT:
 TSNIISM
 Federal Research and Production Center Altai
 Votkinsky Zavod
 Federal Research and Production Center Titan Barrikady
 Izhevsk Motor Plant Axion-Holding

Rockets and missiles
Start-1
RPK-9 Medvedka
TR-1 Temp
SS-16 Sinner
RT-2PM Topol
RT-2PM2 Topol-M
RS-24 Yars
RSM-56 Bulava
BZhRK Barguzin
RS-26 Rubezh

See also

Titan-Barrikady

References

External links 
 Official website
 Russia: Moscow Institute of Thermal Technology from Nuclear Threat Initiative.
 Opinion & analysis Russia's ICBM design firm: looking back at a dramatic 60-year story.
 Thermal Technology.

 
Research institutes in Russia
Soviet and Russian space institutions
Research institutes in the Soviet Union
Companies based in Moscow
Defence companies of Russia
Government-owned companies of Russia
Roscosmos divisions and subsidiaries
Ministry of the Defense Industry (Soviet Union)
Research institutes established in 1946